The Scheuerfeld and Emmerzhausen railway, also known as the Westerwald Railway, is a railway line in the northernmost part of the German federated state of Rhineland-Palatinate. There was a pit railway here as early as the last decades of the 19th century, used to transport ore and other minerals, but after the turn of the century, a standard gauge railway was built for public transport.

Literature 

 Gerd Wolff: Deutsche Klein- und Privatbahnen. Band 1: Rhineland-Palatinate/Saarland. EK-Verlag, Freiburg 1989, S. 264–284.

References

External links 
 

Railway lines in Rhineland-Palatinate
Railway lines in North Rhine-Westphalia
Westerwald
Altenkirchen (district)